St. Mother Irini (9 February 1936 Girga – 31 October 2006 Cairo) was the Coptic Abbess of the St. Philopateer Mercurius’ (Abu Sefein, “of the two swords”) Convent in Old Cairo, Egypt and an influential figure in the Coptic Christian community of Egypt.

Tamav was consecrated as the head of the convent on 15 October 1962 (Babah 5th 1679 according to the Coptic Calendar). According to some accounts, Tamav was visited by, and communicated with, St. Philopatyr Mercurius and St. Anthony the Great. Tamav is credited with numerous miracles, while alive and after her death.  At least six of her books have been translated in English.

Upbringing

Tamav was born on 9 February 1936 in Girga, a small town in Upper Egypt in Sohag Governorate.  She was the eldest of seven children born to wealthy Coptic Orthodox Christian parents. Tamav was baptised as a Christian in the Monastery of Saint Shenoudah the Archimandrite in Sohaq.

Abu Seifein monastery

On 6 October 1954, Tamav became a nun in the Convent of Abu Seifein in Cairo at age 18, the youngest nun there.

As with other nuns in her order, Tamav took a vow of lifetime poverty. On 15 October 1962, she was ordained the abbess of Abu-Sefain.  Her life was to be focused instead on vigil, prayer, fasting and struggle, purity, poverty, solitude and stillness.

Work as Abbess
After becoming the abbess of the Convent of Abu Seifein, Tamav stated that she had received a vision of Christ and of St Pachomius the Great (292-348 AD), one of founders of the communal life of monks and nuns (Cenobitic Monasticism).  St Pachom allegedly told Tamav to follow the rules of the Pachomian Koinonia (fellowship) in the convent.  She then banned all forms of personal property or segregation, and introduced group prayers and meals.

Before Tamav became Abbess, the nuns attended mass and communion in an adjacent church, dedicated to St. Saint Mercurius.  Tamav founded St. Mercurius' Church and subsequently founded a second church inside the monastery in honor of the Virgin Mary, on the site where she sat with Jesus during the Holy Family's flight.

Mother Irene popularised the veneration of Saint Mercurius among Coptic Christians. In this sense she is often compared with Pope Kyrillos VI whose name became associated with the Egyptian martyr, St Mena. On Abi Seifein's feasts—celebrating his martyrdom, the coming of his relics to Egypt, and the consecration of the first Coptic church in his name—she would speak to the thousands who gathered about the miracles performed through the intercession of the saint.

In her weekly meetings, Tamav spoke about heaven to her audience, with the intention of conveying to them hope and consolation. Her talks attracted many devotees, and the number of nuns under her guidance increased.  Some of her nuns became leaders of other convents in Cairo.

Under Tamav's guidance, Abu-Sefain published a book highlighting the contribution of women to monastic and ascetic life. The Angelic Life: The Virgin Mary and Other Virgins in Different Ages (Cairo: Harmony Printing House, 2002), can be regarded as a new historicist reading of the monastic movement, from which perspective it sets the record straight regarding the role played by women in this movement.

Illness 
After 25 years of ill health, On 31 October 2006 Tamav died.  Thousands of mourners queued to pay their last respects to Tamav on the day following her death. At her funeral, Bishop Raphaeil (General Bishop) spoke on behalf of Pope Shenouda III.

In their memorial the nuns at Abu-Sefain described Tamav as their "enlightened mother, mentor, teacher, guide and the lamp whose light would remain for ever". They also expressed their gratitude "for being the daughters of the mother of monasticism in this generation, for having been watered by the fountain of her sacred life and enlightened by the torch of her monastic and spiritual teachings which will remain to guide us until we meet her in heaven". she was a good nun Amen. Amen.

Miracle and Vision of St. Philopatyr Mercurius 
During a time when Mother Irini was abbess of the monastery, the Egyptian military was building roads nearby. Originally, the engineers planned that the highway would be built right next to the monastery. But the Devil tempted them to plan the highway to intersect the monastery, so it was then planned that part of the monastery will be destroyed. The government then claimed the land and started construction.

When Mother Irini heard this, she was deeply sad and prayed to God to find a solution. God then sent St. Philopatyr Abu Sayfain to come to her aid. The saint then said that they will solve this problem by addressing it to the Egyptian President, Hosni Mubarak. Immediately, both Mother Irini and St Philopatyr were teleported to the president's bedroom, where he was sleeping.

When they woke him up, Mubarak was in shock and shouted "By the name of God! How did you come here? The door is closed!" St Philopatyr then said "By the power of Christ we can move through locked doors." The President then recognized Mother Irini and said "Aren't you the Abbess of the St. Philopatyr Monastery? I have seen a picture of you." Mother Irini then answered "Yes, they had an article about me in Wadki.(an Egyptian magazine.)" Mubarak then asked Mother Irini," Who is this man with you?" Mother Irini then said "He is the Patron Saint of the monastery, St. Philopatyr Abu Sayfain." Mubarak then asked what they wanted. St Philopatyr then said "Don't come close or lay a hand on the monastery." Mubarak then agreed immediately. St Philopatyr then disappeared and Mother Irini was teleported back to her room in the monastery.

It is unknown if Mubarak converted to Christianity or not. Most Copts suggest otherwise due to the difficulties of converting people from Islam to Christianity in Egypt. They are certain, however, that Mubarak believed in the Christian faith

References

External links 
 The departure of Mother Irini
 Tamavireneforall is a nonprofit site that shows material about Tamav Irene whether in video, audio or in written form. This great site is a complete reference to her life.
 Tamav Irene: The life and the legacy of Tamav Irene
 Facebook page about Mother Irini
 Memorial article for Tamav Irene, Al-Ahram Weekly on-line, Issue no. 820, 16-22 November 2006. Published in Cairo by AL-AHRAM established in 1875.
 https://www.youtube.com/watch?v=Jm55fcZl2lI A video of Mother Irini telling miracles to some visitors of the monastery. The miracle mentioned in this article is present in the video.

1936 births
2006 deaths
Coptic Orthodox abbesses
Egyptian women writers
People from Sohag Governorate
Coptic Orthodox Christians from Egypt
20th-century Christian nuns